In the 2005 Cameroonian Premier League season, 18 teams competed. Cotonsport Garoua won the championship.

League standings

References
Cameroon - List of final tables (RSSSF)

Cam
Cam
1
Elite One seasons